Learn to Swim is a Canadian drama film, directed by Thyrone Tommy and released in 2021. Tommy's debut full-length feature, the film centres on a stormy romantic relationship between Dezi (Thomas Antony Olajide) and Selma (Emma Ferreira), two talented but troubled jazz musicians.

Both Olajide and Ferreira were named among TIFF's annual Rising Stars program for emerging actors.

The film premiered in the Discovery program at the 2021 Toronto International Film Festival.

Critical response
Norman Wilner of Now rated the film four N's, writing that "from one angle it could be A Star Is Born; from another, maybe it's Once. But music – especially jazz – is all about taking the standards and reinterpreting them into new forms, giving us something new that we can still recognize in flashes. That's what Tommy and co-writer Marni Van Dyk are doing with Learn To Swim, scrambling time and weaving other storylines into Dezi and Selma's collaboration."

For the National Post, Chris Knight wrote that "In all honestly you could probably sit back, close your eyes and just listen to the music, but then you’d be missing out on the beautifully interwoven story of romance. After all, when someone presents you with a lovingly crafted mix tape, you don’t just listen to side one."

Awards
The film was a nominee for the DGC Discovery Award at the 2021 Directors Guild of Canada awards. and was named to TIFF's annual year-end Canada's Top Ten list for 2021.

The film received two Canadian Screen Award nominations at the 10th Canadian Screen Awards in 2022, for Best Actor (Olajide) and Best Original Song ("And Then We Don't" by Tika Simone and Casey Manierka-Quaile). Simone and Manierka-Quaile won Best Original Song.

References

External links

Learn to Swim at Library and Archives Canada

2021 films
2021 drama films
Canadian romantic drama films
English-language Canadian films
Black Canadian films
Jazz films
2020s English-language films
2020s Canadian films